"Romeo and Juliet" is a 1978 disco single written and recorded by Cairo-born disco producer, Alec R. Costandinos and the Syncophonic Orchestra. The single was a retelling of Shakespeare's Romeo and Juliet and was taken from the album of the same name. The single spent one week at number one of the dance/disco chart in March 1978.

See also
List of number-one dance singles of 1978 (U.S.)

References

1978 songs
1978 singles
Songs written by Alec R. Costandinos
Works based on Romeo and Juliet
Casablanca Records singles
Disco songs